Jam Nawaz Ali (ڄام نواز علي) is taluka (sub-district) and a city in Sanghar District, Sindh, Pakistan about 60 km from Sanghar city. This is the place of residence for the Jams of Sanghar who ruled the Province of Sindh with Thatta as the Capital. The Jams of Sanghar are also the Nawabs and head of the Samma and Junejo Tribes in Pakistan. The Nawab Jam Family of Sindh is recognized by the great services rendered by Nawab Jam Mitha Khan who was the Nawab of the Samma and Junejo Tribes, followed by his younger brothers, Nawab Jam Jan Muhammad Khan and Nawab Jam Kambhu Khan. Nawab Jam Sadiq Ali Khan (Former Chief Minister of Sindh) was born in this city. Cadet College Sanghar and Police Recruit Training Centre is also situated in this city.

Populated places in Sindh
Sanghar District
Tehsils of Sindh